Shumikhinsky is a rural locality (a settlement) in Gremyachinsky Urban okrug, Perm Krai, Russia. The population was 1,645 as of 2010. There are 31 streets.

Geography 
Shumikhinsky is located 32 km north of Gremyachinsk (the district's administrative centre) by road. Yubileyny is the nearest rural locality.

References 

Rural localities in Perm Krai